(also sometimes credited as 三国連太郎) (January 20, 1923 – April 14, 2013) was a Japanese film actor from Gunma Prefecture. He appeared in over 150 films since making his screen debut in 1951, and won three Japanese Academy Awards for Best Actor, and a further seven nominations. He also won two Blue Ribbon Awards for Best Actor, in 1960 and in 1989. The 1987 film Shinran: Path to Purity (親鸞：白い道), which he wrote and directed, was awarded the Jury Prize at the Cannes Film Festival. Actor Kōichi Satō is his son.

Biography
Mikuni was born the son of a woman who had become pregnant while working as an indentured servant. His mother then married an electrician who had learned his trade while serving in the military, the man Mikuni considered his father. His stepfather was a member of the burakumin, and Mikuni experienced prejudice as a child, such as automatically being suspected of theft when a bicycle was stolen. He was educated to elementary school level and hoped to then start work with his father, but his father insisted that he should attend middle school. Part way through middle school Mikuni dropped out and left home. He was repeatedly sent home from Tokyo by the police. Finally, he escaped, and between the ages of sixteen and twenty, he wandered around Japan and Korea (then under Japanese control) doing a variety of jobs. At the age of twenty, he received call-up papers for the Japanese military.

Mikuni attempted to evade the call-up but was arrested by police after his mother informed on him. Instead of being punished he was simply sent to serve in China. He served his time in a unit of unfit and incompetent soldiers, and never fired a weapon at the enemy.

After returning to Japan, he drifted between odd jobs. His career as an actor started when he was asked to do a screen test by a scout. At the time he had no intention of becoming an actor and did the test merely because he was promised some meal tickets.

He took his stage name from his first role in the 1951 film The Good Fairy directed by Keisuke Kinoshita, for which he won the Blue Ribbon award for best newcomer.

He died in Tokyo on April 14, 2013, of acute cardiac failure. In accordance to his wishes, he did not receive a posthumous Dharma name.

Filmography

 The Good Fairy (1951)
 Husband and Wife (1953)
 Samurai I : Musashi Miyamoto (1954)
 Keisatsu nikki (1955)
 A Hole of My Own Making (1955)
 The Burmese Harp (1956)
 Ruri no Kishi (1956)
 Stepbrothers (1957)
 Night Drum (1958)
 Ballad of the Cart (1959)
 Kiku to Isamu (1959)
 The Catch (1961)
 Harakiri (1962) – Saitō Kageyu
 Wolves, Pigs and Men (1964)
 Kwaidan (1965)
 A Fugitive from the Past (1965)
 Zatoichi the Outlaw (1967)
 The Profound Desire of the Gods (1968)
 Tabi no Omosa (1972)
 Coup d'État (1973) 
 Himiko (1974)
 Akai unmei (television) (1976)
 Kiri-no-hata (1977)
 Mount Hakkoda (1977)
 Never Give Up (1978)
 Vengeance is Mine (1979)
 Ah! Nomugi Toge (1979)
 Sailor Suit and Machine Gun (1981)
 The Go Masters (1983)
 A Promise (1986)
 Shinran: Path to Purity (director) (1987)
 A Taxing Woman 2 (1988)
 Tsuribaka Nisshi (1988)
 Wuthering Heights (1988)
 Rikyu (1989) – Sen no Rikyū
 Tsuribaka Nisshi 2 (1989)
 Tsuribaka Nisshi 3 (1990)
 Tsuribaka Nisshi 4 (1991)
 Musuko (1991)
 Luminous Moss (1992)
 Tsuribaka Nisshi 6 (1993)
 Daibyonin (1993)
 Tsuribaka Nisshi 7 (1994)
 Mitabi no kaikyô (1995)
 Oishinbo (1996) – Yūzan Kaibara
 Will to Live (1999)
 Taiga no itteki (2001)
 The Wind Carpet (2003)
 Chronicle of My Mother (2012)

Selected television appearances
Hissatsu Shikakenin (1972) - EP.6
Sekigahara (1981) – Honda Masanobu

Honours
Medal with Purple Ribbon (1984)
Order of the Rising Sun, 4th Class, Gold Rays with Rosette (1993)

Notes

References

External links
 

1923 births
Japanese male actors
People from Gunma Prefecture
2013 deaths
Recipients of the Medal with Purple Ribbon
Recipients of the Order of the Rising Sun, 4th class